Yahotyn Raion was a raion (district) in Kyiv Oblast of Ukraine. Its administrative center was the town of Yahotyn. The raion was abolished on 18 July 2020 as part of the administrative reform of Ukraine, which reduced the number of raions of Kyiv Oblast to seven. The area of Yahotyn Raion was merged into Boryspil Raion.

At the time of disestablishment, the raion consisted of one hromada, Yahotyn urban hromada with the administration in Yahotyn.

References

External links
 City portal of Uahotyn

Former raions of Kyiv Oblast
1923 establishments in Ukraine
Ukrainian raions abolished during the 2020 administrative reform